Kaouther Ben Hania (born 1977) is a Tunisian film director. Beauty and the Dogs (2017), her best-known film,  was selected as the Tunisian entry for the Best Foreign Language Film at the 91st Academy Awards. Her 2020 film The Man Who Sold His Skin was nominated for the Best International Feature Film at the 93rd Academy Awards.

Biography
Kaouther Ben Hania was born in Sidi Bouzid. She studied at the Ecole des Arts et du Cinéma (EDAC) in Tunisia, then studied at La Fémis and the Sorbonne in Paris.

Filmography
 Me, My Sister and the Thing, 2006
 Les imams vont à l’école, 2010
 Yed Ellouh (Wooden Hand), 2013
 Le Challat de Tunis (Challat of Tunis), 2013
 Zaineb Takrahou Ethelj (Zaineb Hates the Snow), 2016
 La Belle et la Meute (Beauty and the Dogs), 2017
 Les Pastèques du Cheikh (Sheikh's Watermelons) (short film), 2018
 The Man Who Sold His Skin'', 2020

References

External links
 

1977 births
Living people
Tunisian women film directors